Industry was an American new wave band formed in 1978 in New York City as Industrial Complex, their name later changing to Industry. In 1981, the band became commercial but disbanded three years later. Their only well known album was Stranger to Stranger, released in 1984 which included the hit single, "State of the Nation". Due to some pop ballads on their 1984 album, the band has been dubbed as "The American Spandau Ballet".

Members
1978–1981 (1978 as Industrial Complex, 1979 as Industry)
 Andrew Geyer - guitar, tape loops
 Mercury Caronia - vocals, drums
 Sean Kelly - bass, backing vocals
1981–1984 (as Industry)
 Jon Carin - lead vocals, keyboards, synthesizers
 Brian Unger - guitar, backing vocals
 Mercury Caronia - drums, backing vocals
 Rudy Perrone - bass guitar, backing vocals
2014–2016 (as MASS/Industry)
 Mercury Caronia - drums, keyboards, vocals
 Andrew Geyer - guitar, tape loops, vocals
 Sean Kelly - bass, keyboards, vocals
 Steven Northshield - guitar

History
Industry was founded as Industrial Complex in 1978 by Mercury Caronia (drummer, vocalist, keyboard player, composer and studio engineer), Andrew Geyer (guitarist) and Sean Kelly (bass guitarist and backing vocalist). The band's name was later changed to Industry. Caronia and Geyer worked with experimental electronic music, odd time signatures, tape loops, synthesizers and innovative guitar playing into various methods of recording.

In 1981, Geyer and Kelly left the band. Guitarist Brian Unger, new lead singer Jon Carin and Rudy Perrone (who was previously in a progressive rock band called Cathedral, with Mercury Caronia) joined the group which signed to Capitol Records.

The band's best-known single, "State of the Nation", entered the Swedish and Italian charts between 1983 and 1984, earning them a place as the support act for artists such as Billy Idol, Talk Talk and INXS. The second single from the same album, "Still of the Night", was less successful. The band split up in 1984.

Post-split
After the split, Carin started a successful session musician and solo career, becoming a permanent member of the Pink Floyd live band and co-writing Pink Floyd's hit single "Learning to Fly". Unger and Perrone went on to form their own bands.

Reformation

In October 2014, Mercury Caronia, Andy Geyer, Sean Kelly and Steven Northshield reformed as a band, naming themselves 'MASS', before changing the group's name back to 'Industry'. Many hours of unreleased studio recordings exist (new compositions from October 2014 to July 2016), but there is no anticipated release date for the material.

Discography

Albums
Stranger to Stranger (1984) No. 16 Italy

EPs
Logging Time (1980)
Turning to Light (1981)
Industry (1983)  (Mini vinyl LP / 5 songs)

Singles
"Logging Time" (1980)
"Ready for the Wave" (1980)
"Turning to Light" (1981)
"State of the Nation" (1983) - AUS No.78, ITA No. 1, SWE No. 10, U.S. No. 81
"Communication" (1983)
"Still of the Night" (1984)
"What Have I Got to Lose" (1984)

References

American new wave musical groups
Musical groups established in 1978
Musical groups disestablished in 1984
Synth-pop new wave musical groups
Capitol Records artists